Perry, New York, is the name of two locations in Wyoming County, New York.  

Perry (village), New York
Perry (town), New York